Composia utowana is a moth of the family Erebidae. It was described by Marston Bates in 1933. It is found on the Bahamas.

References

Composia
Moths described in 1933